The 2021 season is Albirex Niigata Singapore FC's 18th consecutive season in the top flight of Singapore football and in the S.League, having joined the Sleague in 2004. Along with the 2021 Singapore Premier League, the club will also compete in the Singapore Cup and the Singapore League Cup.

Squad

SPL Squad

U17 Squad

Coaching staff

Transfer

In

Pre-season

Mid-season

Loan In 
Pre-season

Out
Pre-season

Mid-season

Loan Out

Retained / Extension / Promoted

Friendly

Pre-season friendlies

In-season friendlies

Team statistics

Appearances and goals
As at 17 Sept 2021

Competitions

Overview

Charity Shield

Singapore Premier League

Singapore Cup

Notes

References

Albirex Niigata Singapore FC
Albirex Niigata Singapore FC seasons